The Tennis and Racquet Club is a private social club and athletic club located at 939 Boylston Street, in the Back Bay neighborhood of Boston, Massachusetts.  It is a contributing structure in the National Register Historic District.

Designed by Parker and Thomas in the classical revival style, and built by Frank L. Whitcomb in 1902, the Tennis and Racquet Club is representative of the ornate private clubs constructed in Boston during the early twentieth century.

The club still contains its original court tennis court and racquets court.  Today the club also has three international and three North American squash courts, although previously there had been more, including a squash tennis court.  Additionally, the club is home to one of the nine real tennis courts in the United States.  Many of the original social rooms have been converted into office or restaurant rentals.

See also
 List of American gentlemen's clubs

External links
 Tennis and Racquet Club

Clubs and societies in Massachusetts
Racquets venues in the United States
Real tennis venues
Sports clubs established in 1902
Sports venues in Boston
Squash venues in the United States
Gentlemen's clubs in the United States
Historic district contributing properties in Massachusetts
National Register of Historic Places in Boston
Clubhouses on the National Register of Historic Places in Massachusetts
Sports venues on the National Register of Historic Places in Massachusetts
Tennis clubs